The Ford C2 platform is an automobile platform developed by Ford since 2018. It replaced the Ford C1 platform as the platform for its compact cars (C-segment). The modularity of the platform enables it to be used for various models, which spreads out development costs over more vehicles. It can use torsion beam or multilink rear suspension. Unlike its predecessor, the C2 platform can be used for cars of varying wheelbases and track widths, from subcompact to compact. Vehicles based on the C2 platform have been reviewed very favourably with regards to driving characteristics.

Applications

 Ford Focus (fourth generation) (C519; 2018–present)
 Ford Escape (fourth generation)/Kuga (third generation) (CX482; 2019–present)
 Ford Bronco Sport (CX430; 2020–present)
 Ford Maverick (P758; 2021–present)
 Ford Evos (2021–present)
 Ford Mondeo (China) (2022–present)
 Lincoln Corsair (CX483; 2019–present)
 Lincoln Z (2022–present)

References

Ford platforms